The 2017–18 Bosnia and Herzegovina Football Cup was the 22nd edition of Bosnia and Herzegovina's annual football cup, and the eighteenth season of the unified competition. The winner will qualify to the 2018–19 UEFA Europa League.

Format changes
From this season on, Second round will be played over one leg instead of two. Also, if teams from different levels are paired in First round, team from lower league will host the match.

Participating teams
Following teams will take part in 2017–18 Bosnia and Herzegovina Football Cup.

Roman number in brackets denote the level of respective league in Bosnian football league system

Calendar

1 Draw is held to determine what team will host leg 1 and what team will host leg 2.

Bracket

First round
Played on 19 and 20 September 2017

Second round
Played on 25 October and 1 November 2017

Quarter final
First legs played on 22 and 30 November, return legs played on 29 November and 7 December

Semi final
First legs played on 11 April, return legs played on 18 April

Final
First leg played on May 2, return leg played on May 9

First leg

Second leg

External links
Football Federation of Bosnia and Herzegovina
SportSport.ba

2017–18
2017–18 in Bosnia and Herzegovina football
2017–18 European domestic association football cups